The Plaza Vicente López y Planes is a public space in Recoleta, Buenos Aires, Argentina.

Limits the property of Paraná, Montevideo, Arenales and Juncal Vicente Lopez streets; the square of moderate size (if not smaller) then you have a plant that takes an almost triangular in appearance having its northeast end the beginning Las Heras avenue.

One of the peculiarities of this place is that she was walking in the 1909 Santiago Ramón Estrada singing some of his songs that would later come to national scenarios of greater importance.

About the Parish Montevideo street commonly called "The Slave" (Sacred Heart of Jesus) Church officially stands and Eucharistic Heart of Jesus. Beautiful eclectic building in which Gothic and Romanesque details predominate built between the late nineteenth and early twentieth century as a votive gift from a wealthy family in the order of nuns called Handmaids of the Sacred Heart of Jesus.

The square honors the author of the Argentine national anthem: Vicente López y Planes is flanked by high and very flowery spring trees of the broads and jacarandaes species, bearing within it a great ombú following urban design and landscape requirements Carlos Thays who despite being born in France he became a naturalized Argentine and preferred to the streets, squares and locals parks had flora of the country rather than imported.

References

External links

Tourist attractions in Buenos Aires
Lopez